Hamtic, officially the Municipality of Hamtic, , is a 3rd class municipality in the province of Antique, Philippines. According to the 2020 census, it has a population of 52,685 people. Making it third most populous municipality in the province of Antique.

Hamtic was formerly named Antique, after which the province was named. It is the oldest town and the first capital of the province before it was transferred to San Jose de Buenavista in 1802. The town speaks three dialects, namely Hamtikanon (a unique town dialect), Karay-a (the lingua franca of Antique province), and Hiligaynon (the regional dialect).

“Hantik” was named after the humming big black ants that produce the sound “tik” when they bite.

History
Hamtic was created from portions of San Jose de Buenavista, through Executive Order No. 3 signed by President Ramon Magsaysay on January 5, 1954.

Geography

According to the Philippine Statistics Authority, the municipality has a land area of  constituting  of the  total area of Antique.

Climate

Barangays
Hamtic is politically subdivided into 47 barangays.

Demographics

In the 2020 census, Hamtic had a population of 52,685.

Economy

References

External links

 [ Philippine Standard Geographic Code]

Municipalities of Antique (province)
Former provincial capitals of the Philippines
Establishments by Philippine executive order